Colombia, Nuevo León is a planned community founded in 1992 by the Mexican state of Nuevo León in the  Anáhuac Municipality. It lies on the southern banks of the Río Grande, across from the United States city of Laredo, Texas. According to the INEGI Census, in 2010 Colombia had a population of 514.

History
It was founded in the Nuevo León / Texas border in order to compete with the bordering Mexican states of Coahuila and Tamaulipas in the Import / Export market. One year after its founding the Colombia-Solidarity International Bridge, (the 4th most important border crossing in the American - Mexican border) was opened. Colombia was named in honor of Christopher Columbus, since it was founded 500 years after he first came into contact with the Americas.

Future
 A Railroad International Bridge is currently waiting presidential approval from United States
 A second International Road Bridge is planned
 An International Cargo Airport is in the planning stages

External links
 American Planning Association
 OECD Nuevo Leon Information
 Aerial View From WikiMapia

Laredo–Nuevo Laredo
Populated places in Nuevo León
Populated places established in 1992
Populated places on the Rio Grande